Naxalbari railway station is a railway station in Darjeeling district, West Bengal which lies on the Katihar–Siliguri line. Its code is NAK. It serves Naxalbari town which is just 5.7 km away from Panitanki, which is the border between India and Nepal. The station consists of a single platform. The platform is not well sheltered. It lacks many facilities including water and sanitation..

Trains
Following trains are operated through this station-
Siliguri Junction-Balurghat Express
Siliguri Junction-Katihar Express
 Siliguri–Katihar Passenger (unreserved)
 Radhikapur–Siliguri DEMU
 Siliguri Jn.–Malda Court DEMU
 NJP–Siliguri–Alubari Road-NJP–SGUJ Ring DEMU

References 

Katihar railway division
Railway stations in Darjeeling district